Chow Chung (born 16 September 1932) is a Hong Kong film and television actor, and a member of the South China Film Industry Workers Union (33rd Federation). He was chair for three consecutive years, resigning in 2005.

Career 
In 1955, Chow started his acting career with Lan Kwong Film Co, a film production company. Chow Nam debuted in Broken Zither Bower, a 1955 Historical Drama film directed by Yeung Kung-Leung. Chow  is credited with over 85 films.  Chow acted in movies until the early 1980s. When his movie career faded, he worked at the 觀塘銀都戲院 (Chinese Theater) as a manager. Later he joined TVB.

Filmography

Films 
This is a partial list of films.
 1955 Broken Zither Bower
 1956 Flying Tigers
 1966 Lady Bond - Sung Kar-Kui.
 2008 Fatal Move - Kung.

Television Series

Awards 
 2016 Lifetime Achievement Award. Presented at the TVB Anniversary Awards 2016.

References

TVB veteran actors
Living people
1932 births